George Skivington (born 3 December 1982) is a rugby union coach and former player. He is the current head coach of Premiership Rugby side Gloucester.

Early life and education
Skivington was born in Warrington, Cheshire.

Skivington played junior rugby at London Irish. He attended Wimbledon College and then moved to John Fisher School in Purley (also attended by fellow Ex-Wasp and England winger Paul Sackey and Scotland prop Kyle Traynor.) before joining the Saracens Academy.

Playing career

Skivington played for Saracens, London Wasps (a successful period for the club, including being coached by Warren Gatland), Leicester Tigers, London Irish and England Saxons. His position was lock. He captained both London Irish and England Saxons.

Club career
Skivington joined London Wasps in 2001, In 2008 he signed a contract keeping him at the club until 2010.

On 14 April 2010, it was announced that Skivington would be moving away from Wycombe to join Premiership rivals Leicester Tigers at the end of the season. His final game for Leicester was the Premiership final at Twickenham against Harlequins.

On 23 January 2012, it was announced that Skivington would be joining London Irish from the start of the 2012/2013 season. He played 62 times for London Irish, and captained them, before retiring in June 2016 (age 33) due to an ongoing shoulder injury.

International career
Skivington was called into the England Saxons side that defeated Ireland A on 1 February 2008. He later represented England Saxons at the 2008 Churchill Cup.
On 28 January 2010 he was named captain of the England Saxons side to play Ireland A at Bath's Recreation Ground on Sunday 31 January. He led his team to a 17–13 victory, and again against Italy A.
Skivington also lead the Saxons throughout their victorious Churchill Cup campaign in summer 2010.

Skivington was called up to England's 2011 Six Nations Championship squad on 24 January 2011 as injury cover for Courtney Lawes.

Coaching career

Ealing Trailfinders 
Whilst still playing, Skivington acted as assistant coach at Ealing Trailfinders from 2014 – 2016. Helping Ealing gain promotion from National 1 League in 2014/15 and a successful campaign in the championship in 2015/16.

London Irish 
After his playing retirement from London Irish, Skivington was immediately appointed as Forwards Coach.

Samoa 
Skivington was also an assistant coach for Samoa in 2015 for their historic game against the All Blacks in Apia, Samoa on 8 July 2015 where they narrowly lost 25–16.
Skivington was then part of the Samoan coaching team for the 2015 Pacific Nations Cup and the 2015 World Cup in England.

Gloucester 
In June 2020, Skivington was announced as the new head coach of Gloucester Rugby after the departure of both head coach Johan Ackermann and director of rugby David Humphreys. London Irish have announced publicly they believe the appointment breached protocol. The claim has been denied by Gloucester.

Coaching characteristics
Skivington has highlighted the importance of player character and overall group contribution, communication and the value of squad competition for places.

References

External links
Its Rugby Profile
Wasps profile
England profile

1982 births
Living people
English rugby union coaches
English rugby union players
Wasps RFC players
Leicester Tigers players
London Irish players
Rugby union locks
Rugby union players from Warrington